Live with Kelly and Michael was the 2012–2016 title of a long-running American syndicated morning talk show. Kelly Ripa and Michael Strahan were the hosts in that period.

Season 25 (2012–13)

September 2012

October 2012

November 2012

December 2012

January 2013

February 2013

March 2013

April 2013

May 2013

June 2013

July 2013

August 2013

Season 26 (2013–14)

September 2013

October 2013

November 2013

December 2013

January 2014

February 2014

March 2014

April 2014

May 2014

June 2014

July 2014

August 2014

Season 27 (2014–15)

September 2014

October 2014

November 2014

December 2014

January 2015

February 2015

March 2015

April 2015

May 2015

June 2015

July 2015

August 2015

Season 28 (2015–16)
Episodes starting May 16, 2016, was rebranded as LIVE! with Kelly.

September 2015

October 2015

November 2015

December 2015

January 2016

February 2016

March 2016

April 2016

May 2016

References

Lists of American non-fiction television series episodes